A by-election was held for the Australian House of Representatives seat of East Sydney on 6 February 1932. This was triggered by the death of United Australia Party MP John Clasby, who had been elected at the 1931 election and never taken his seat in Parliament.

The by-election was won by New South Wales Labor candidate Eddie Ward, who had previously won the seat in a by-election the previous year but lost it to Clasby at the federal election. The Labor Party had split in New South Wales with Ward adhering to the group headed by Jack Lang, the Premier of New South Wales.

Results

References

1932 elections in Australia
New South Wales federal by-elections